Dr. Valentin Narcisse is a fictional character from the HBO TV series Boardwalk Empire, portrayed by Jeffrey Wright. He is a prominent and highly educated underworld figure based in Harlem, New York and a Black nationalist orator, active in Marcus Garvey's Universal Negro Improvement Association.

Inspiration
Narcisse was based on Casper Holstein, a prominent New York mobster who came up from the Virgin Islands, and ultimately became the biggest and first massive numbers-runner in Harlem during the Harlem Renaissance.

Reception
Narcisse was the driving force behind the downfall of the few sympathetic characters on Boardwalk Empire, particularly Albert "Chalky" White (Michael K. Williams) and Daughter Maitland (Margot Bingham).  His motivations often stem from the need to be right or the thrill of antagonizing people, and he is one of the few characters to never be shown in a good light.  Although Wright joined the cast during the show's penultimate season, his character is often cited as one of the series' best villains.

References

External links
Dr. Valentin Narcisse Bio at HBO.com

Boardwalk Empire
Television characters introduced in 2013
Fictional businesspeople
Fictional characters based on real people
Fictional crime bosses
Fictional gangsters
Drama television characters
Fictional drug dealers
Fictional African-American people
Fictional murdered people
American male characters in television
Fictional money launderers